The yellow-billed jacamar (Galbula albirostris) is a species of bird in the family Galbulidae. It is found in Brazil, Colombia, Ecuador, French Guiana, Guyana, Peru, Suriname, and Venezuela.

Taxonomy and systematics

The yellow-billed jacamar was placed in its own genus, Pslilpornis, in the early 20th century; that genus was merged into Galbula by the middle of the century. It and the blue-necked jacamar (Galbula cyanicollis) were later considered conspecific but have been treated as a superspecies since approximately 1974. The yellow-billed jacamar has two subspecies, the nominate Galbula albirostris albirostris and G. a. chalcocephala.

Description

The male's crown is glossy copper or purplish and the rest of the upper parts are emerald green. The chin is buff, the throat white, and the rest of the underparts are pale reddish cinnamon. The female has paler underparts and a reddish buff throat.

Compared to the nominate, its crown is bronzy purple and its back a darker bronzy green. The chin is darker and the reddish cinnamon of the underparts is richer. The male's throat is the same white but the female's is reddish cinnamon.

Distribution and habitat

Both subspecies of yellow-billed jacamar occur east of the Andes and north of the Amazon River. The nominate subspecies is found from eastern Colombia's Meta Department through southern and eastern Venezuela into the Guianas and south into northern Brazil. G. a. chalcocephala is found along the upper Orinoco River in southern Venezuela south through southeastern Colombia, eastern Ecuador, and western Brazil to northeastern Peru.

The preferred habitats of the two subspecies differ somewhat. The nominate inhabits terra firme, várzea, and igapó forests, both primary and secondary. Unlike may other jacamars, it is found primarily in the forest interior rather than its edges, but does frequent openings like clearings and treefalls. It also can be found in gallery forest and sandy coastal forest. In general, G. a. chalcocephala has similar requirements, but in Ecuador and Peru it seems to occur only in terra firme forest.

Behavior

Feeding

The yellow-billed jacamar's diet is a large variety of insects. It perches on exposed branches in the canopy, typically in pairs, and sallies from there to catch its flying prey. It also joins mixed-species foraging flocks.

Breeding

Nest burrows of the nominate yellow-billed jacamar have been recorded in arboreal termite nests, and it is assumed to burrow into earth banks as well, like most other jacamars. The nominate nests during the dry season (June to November). Nothing is known about the breeding phenology of G. a. chalcocephala.

Vocalization

The yellow-billed jacamar's song is "a high-pitched 'peea peea-pee-pee-te-t-t-e'e'e'e'e'e' or 'peea-pee-pee-te-t-t-t't't't't'ttttt'r'" ending in a rattle. Its calls are described as "a sharp 'peek', 'tew' and 'trra'", sometimes in a series.

Status

The IUCN has assessed the yellow-billed jacamar as being of Least Concern. However, "it is presumably sensitive to deforestation and other types of habitat destruction."

References

External links
Yellow-billed jacamar videos on the Internet Bird Collection
Yellow-billed jacamar photo gallery VIREO Photo-High Res

yellow-billed jacamar
Birds of the Amazon Basin
Birds of the Guianas
yellow-billed jacamar
Birds of Brazil
Taxonomy articles created by Polbot